St John Page Mbalana Yako (19011977) was a Qokolweni-born Xhosa poet and professor of Xhosa literature in the Eastern Cape, South Africa. A translation of one of his poems was published as "The Contraction and Enclosure of the Land" in The Lava of the Land, an anthology of South-African poetry edited by Denis Hirson. "The Contraction and Enclosure" uses imagery from oral poetry to illustrate the consequences of race-based land legislation of South Africa in the 1950s that destroyed the traditional ways of life of many tribes.

Bibliography
Umtha Welenga ("Ray of the Sun", 1959)
Ikwezi ("Poems", 1959)

References

People from the Eastern Cape
Xhosa-language poets
1901 births
1977 deaths